Ilya Malyushkin is a Russian professional ice hockey forward  who currently plays for Avtomobilist Yekaterinburg of the Kontinental Hockey League.

References

External links

Living people
HC Yugra players
1984 births
Russian ice hockey forwards
Sportspeople from Surgut